Kurtbey is a village in the Uzunköprü district of Edirne Province, Turkey, situated in the eastern Trakya (Thrace) plains at . The population of Kurtbey was 1506 as of 2013. The settlement was founded during the Rise of the Ottoman Empire (14th-15th centuries) by an akıncı (Ottoman militia the 14th to 16th centuries) chief named Kurtbey. In the 19th century, especially following the Russo-Turkish War (1877-1878), Muslim refugees from Bulgaria (mostly Pomaks) and Romania were also settled in Kurtbey. Between 1954 and the 2013 reorganisation, it was a town (belde). The town economy depends on agriculture. The crops are wheat, rice, sunflower, sugarbeet and watermelon.

References

External links
For images (Mayor's page)

Pomak communities in Turkey
Villages in Uzunköprü District